The 18th Directors Guild of America Awards, honoring the outstanding directorial achievements in film and television in 1965, were presented in 1966.

Winners and nominees

Film

Television

D.W. Griffith Award
 William Wyler

External links
 

Directors Guild of America Awards
1965 film awards
1965 television awards
Direct
Direct
1965 awards in the United States